Gary Andersson (born 19 October 1958) is a former Swedish Olympic swimmer. He competed in the 1980 Summer Olympics and finished 20st in the 400 m individual medley.

He started his career as a long-distance swimmer and in 1976 and 1977 won the Swedish championship in 1500 m freestyle. 1977 and 1978 he also won 400 m freestyle. After that he changed to 200m and 400m individual medley. He won the swedish titles 1978 and 1979 in both these competitions.

Personal records 2013 still among the 20 best in Sweden 
 1500 m freestyle 15.41,14 1977
 800 m freestyle 8.17,47 1977
 400 m freestyle 3.58,30 1977

Clubs
In his career he represented more than one club.
 Norrköpings KK -1977
 Kristianstads SLS 1977-1979
 Västerås SS from 1980

References

1958 births
Swedish male medley swimmers
Living people
Swimmers at the 1980 Summer Olympics
Olympic swimmers of Sweden